This is a list of schools in the Isle of Anglesey County in Wales.

Primary schools

Ysgol Beaumaris
Ysgol Gynradd
Ysgol Bodffordd
Ysgol Bogorgan
Ysgol Bryngwran
Ysgol Bryngwran
Ysgol Brynsiencyn
Ysgol Caergeiliog
Ysgol Cemaes
Ysgol Corn Hir
Ysgol Cybi
Ysgol Cylch y Garn
Ysgol Dwyran
Ysgol Esceifiog
Ysgol Ffrwd Win
Ysgol Garreglefn
Ysgol Goronwy Owen
Ysgol Gymuned y Fali
Ysgol Gynradd Amlwch
Ysgol Kingsland
Ysgol Llanbedrgoch
Ysgol Llandegfan
Ysgol Llanfachraeth
Ysgol Llanfairpwllgwyngyll
Ysgol Llanfawr
Ysgol Llanfechell
Ysgol Llaingoch - Closed in 2017
Ysgol Llangaffo
Ysgol Llangoed
Ysgol Llannerch-Y-Medd
Ysgol Henblas
Ysgol Moelfre
Ysgol Morswyn
Ysgol Niwbwrch
Ysgol Parc Y Bont
Ysgol Pencarnisiog
Ysgol Pentraeth
Ysgol Penysarn
Ysgol Rhoscolyn
Ysgol Rhosneigr
Ysgol Rhosybol
Ysgol Santes Fair
Ysgol Talwrn
Ysgol y Borth
Ysgol y Ffridd
Ysgol y Graig
Ysgol y Tywyn

Secondary schools
Ysgol David Hughes
Ysgol Gyfun Llangefni
Ysgol Syr Thomas Jones
Ysgol Uwchradd Bodedern
Ysgol Uwchradd Caergybi

Special schools
Ysgol y Bont

 
Anglesey